William Joseph Susman (born August 29, 1960) is an American composer of concert and film music and a pianist. He has written orchestral and chamber music as well as documentary film scores.

Music
Susman's music is inspired by Afro-Cuban montuño, medieval hocket and isorhythm. In addition to performances of his music in the U.S. and Europe, his compositions have been broadcast, for example his piano concerto on WQXR, in New Sounds on WNYC, Echoes on NPR and Concertzender.

He founded the record label Belarca Records to distribute his material and the work of other living composers.

Influences
Susman's earliest orchestral works were influenced by Iannis Xenakis and György Ligeti. He is interested in algorithmic composition, following his composition teacher Herbert Brun at the University of Illinois. His microtonal compositions were influenced by Ben Johnston. He also studied piano with Pauline Lindsey (a student of Artur Schnabel), Steve Behr (pianist with Louis Armstrong) and Alan Swain.

Awards
 ASCAP Foundation Young Composer Award for Trailing Vortices
 ASCAP Foundation Raymond Hubbell Award for Movement for Orchestra
 BMI Student Composer Award for Pentateuch
 Fromm Music Foundation at Harvard for Trailing Vortices
 Gaudeamus International Musicweek for Trailing Vortices
 International Documentary Association Pare Lorenz Award, for Oil on Ice  
 KUCYNA/ALEA III International Composers Competition for Twisted Figures
 Percussive Arts Society for Exchanges

Works

Orchestra
In A State of Patterns (2018)
Piano Concerto (2011)
Snow Lion of Peace (2009)
Zydeco Madness: To the Forgotten of Hurricane Katrina (2006)
Angels of Light (1991)
Uprising (1989)
Trailing Vortices (1986)
Pentateuch (1984)
Openings (1982)
Movement for Orchestra (1980)

Chamber ensemble
Seven Scenes for Four Flutes (2011)
Camille (2010)
Clouds and Flames (2010)
Native New Yorker (2005)
Three Different Keyboards  (2001)
The Starry Dynamo  (1994)
Exposé  (1989)
Twisted Figures (1987)
Streamlines (1984)
For Three Trombones (1983)

Wind quintet
Six Minutes Thirty Seconds (1995)

Brass quintet
The Heavens Above (1998)

Vocal/Choral
Salaam Alaykum, Shalom Alaychem (2011) SATB
Eternal Light (2010) SATB
Scatter My Ashes (2009)
Living These Seasons (2009) SATB & piano
Moving in to an Empty Space (1992)
Interlude (1984)
Two Songs (1983)
Elie (1983) SATB
Three Songs (1981)

Percussion
Haskalah for marimba and organ (2017)
Material Rhythms for percussion quartet (2010)
Amores Montuños for flute & marimba (2008)
Marimba Montuño for marimba (2002)
Floating Falling for cello and timpani (1987)
Exchanges for percussion soloist and winds (1982)

String quartet
String Quartet No. 6: Isolation Songs (2020)
String Quartet No. 5: Dancing on Air (2013)
String Quartet No. 4: Zydeco Madness (2006)
String Quartet No. 3: Patterns of Change (1997)
String Quartet No. 2: Up to the Sky  (1988)
String Quartet No. 1: Streams (1984)

Piano Trio
Clouds and Flames (2010)

Piano
Quiet Rhythms - Book IV (2013) A set of 22 piano pieces
Quiet Rhythms - Book III (2012) A set of 22 piano pieces
Quiet Rhythms - Book II (2010) A set of 22 piano pieces
Quiet Rhythms - Book I (2010) A set of 22 piano pieces
Piano Montuño  (2004)
Uprising  (1988)

Solo and duo
Zydeco Madness for accordion (2005)
Duo Montuño for clarinet & piano  (2004)
Duo Montuño for alto sax & piano  (2004)
Duo Montuño for viola and piano  (2004)
Motions of Return for flute & piano  (1996)
For Cello  (1984)
Halilah  for viola (1983)
Nnyl  for trombone (1983)
Turbulence  for flute (1983)
Violin Study  (1983)

Electronic
Waves for piano and computer-generated sound (version with notated piano part) (1982)
Waves for Any number of improvisers and computer-generated sound (1982)

Film music
People of the Graphic Novel (2012)
Joann Sfar Draws from Memory (2012)
When Medicine Got It Wrong (2009)
Balancing Acts: A Jewish Theater in the Soviet Union (2008)
Making the Man (2007)
Fate of the Lhapa (2007)
Native New Yorker (2005)
Oil on Ice (2004)
Asphyxiating Uma (2002)
Deep Under the Ice (2000) aka NASA Explores Under the Ice
Daydream Believer (1998)
Alaska's Arctic Wildlife (1997)
Indonesia (1996)
The Philippines (1996)
Southern Africa Safari (1995)
Discovering the Amazon and the Andes (1994)
The Elephant Seals of Ano Nuevo (1994)
Exploring Tropical Australia (1993)

References

External links
 Susman Music - Official Website including audio files and scores
 
 Music for Moving Pictures A review written for the Folk & Acoustic Music Exchange by Mark S. Tucker
 William Susman Fromm Music Foundation, Commission 1986
 National Gallery of Art in Washington, D.C. to Screen Award-Winning Film Native New Yorker mckenzienewsservice.com
 Contemporary Directions Ensemble Short biography, University of Michigan School of Music 1987
 First Dissertation Recital Short biography, University of Michigan School of Music 9 July 1987
 Native New Yorker 8th United Nations Associations Film Festival (UNAFF) 2005
 Sound of Silent Film: NYC acmusic.org
 In Conversation With William Susman Interview in The Voice Magazine, 2014

20th-century classical composers
21st-century classical composers
American film score composers
American male film score composers
Musicians from Chicago
1960 births
Jewish classical musicians
Jewish American classical composers
Contemporary classical music performers
Living people
Postmodern composers
University of Illinois alumni
Stanford University alumni
New Trier High School alumni
University of Illinois Urbana-Champaign alumni
American male classical composers
American classical composers
21st-century American composers
20th-century American composers
Classical musicians from Illinois
20th-century American male musicians
21st-century American male musicians
21st-century American Jews